Gabrah or Jabrah, is a subject of Baladiyah al-Batha and one of the oldest neighborhoods that came into being after the disintegration of Hajr al-Yamamah in southern Riyadh, Saudi Arabia. The area also gets synonymous with al-Batha or ad-Dirah because of its close proximity with them.

References 

Neighbourhoods in Riyadh